The Fleet Logistics Support Wing (abbreviated as FLSW, also referred to as Commander, Fleet Logistics Support Wing, CFLSW) is a reserve aircraft wing of the United States Navy, stationed at Naval Air Station Joint Reserve Base Fort Worth, Texas. The wing contains 100 percent of the Navy's intra-theater airlift capability, having no active-duty counterpart. The wing is subordinate to the Commander, Naval Air Force Reserve at Naval Air Station North Island, California.

History
The wing was commissioned at Naval Support Activity New Orleans, Louisiana in 1974 as the Reserve Tactical Support Wing, before being redesignated to its present name in 1983. Three years later, in 1986, the wing moved headquarters to Naval Air Station Dallas, Texas before undertaking its most recent relocation to Naval Air Station Joint Reserve Base Fort Worth, Texas in 1997.

Units
, the wing is made up of 12 squadrons, based in 10 locations:
 Fleet Logistics Support Squadron 1 (VR-1), Joint Base Andrews, Maryland
 Fleet Logistics Support Squadron 51 (VR-51), Marine Corps Air Station Kaneohe Bay, Hawaii
 Fleet Logistics Support Squadron 53 (VR-53), Joint Base Andrews, Maryland
 Fleet Logistics Support Squadron 54 (VR-54), Naval Air Station Joint Reserve Base New Orleans, Louisiana
 Fleet Logistics Support Squadron 55 (VR-55), Naval Air Station Point Mugu, California
 Fleet Logistics Support Squadron 56 (VR-56), Naval Air Station Oceana, Virginia
 Fleet Logistics Support Squadron 57 (VR-57), Naval Air Station North Island, California
 Fleet Logistics Support Squadron 58 (VR-58), Naval Air Station Jacksonville, Florida
 Fleet Logistics Support Squadron 59 (VR-59), Naval Air Station Joint Reserve Base Fort Worth, Texas
 Fleet Logistics Support Squadron 61 (VR-61), Naval Air Station Whidbey Island, Washington
 Fleet Logistics Support Squadron 62 (VR-62), Naval Air Station Jacksonville, Florida
 Fleet Logistics Support Squadron 64 (VR-64), Joint Base McGuire–Dix–Lakehurst, New Jersey

References 

Air wings of the United States Navy